Shimokhtino is a rural locality (a selo) in Andreyevskoye Rural Settlement, Alexandrovsky District, Vladimir Oblast, Russia. The population was 12 as of 2010.

Geography 
Shimokhtino is located on the Bolshoy Kirzhach River, 26 km east of Alexandrov (the district's administrative centre) by road. Osino is the nearest rural locality.

References 

Rural localities in Alexandrovsky District, Vladimir Oblast